Krimo Bernaoui (born 24 January 1967) is an Algerian volleyball player. He competed in the men's tournament at the 1992 Summer Olympics.

References

External links
 

1967 births
Living people
Algerian men's volleyball players
Olympic volleyball players of Algeria
Volleyball players at the 1992 Summer Olympics
Place of birth missing (living people)
21st-century Algerian people